Robert Cecil Martin (born 5 December 1952), colloquially called "Uncle Bob", is an American software engineer, instructor, and author. He is most recognized for promoting many software design principles and for being an author and signatory of the influential Agile Manifesto.

Martin has authored many books and magazine articles. He was the editor-in-chief of C++ Report magazine and served as the first chairman of the Agile Alliance.

Companies
In 1991, Martin founded Object Mentor, now defunct, which provided instructor-led training on the extreme programming methodology. , he operated two companies:

Uncle Bob Consulting – provides consulting and training services
Clean Coders – which provides training videos

Software principles and advocacy 

Martin is a proponent of software craftsmanship, agile software development, and test-driven development.  

He is credited with coining the SOLID mnemonic, a collection of software principles including "Single Responsibility Principle", "Open-Closed Principle" (invented by Bertrand Meyer.), "Liskov Substitution Principle" (invented by Barbara Liskov,), "Interface Segregation Principle", and "Dependency Inversion Principle".

Publications 
 1995. Designing Object-Oriented C++ Applications Using the Booch Method. Prentice Hall. .
 2002. Agile Software Development, Principles, Patterns, and Practices. Pearson. .
 2009. Clean Code: A Handbook of Agile Software Craftsmanship. Prentice Hall. .
 2011. The Clean Coder: A Code Of Conduct For Professional Programmers. Prentice Hall. .
 2017. Clean Architecture: A Craftsman's Guide to Software Structure and Design. Prentice Hall. .
 2019. Clean Agile: Back to Basics. Prentice Hall. .
 2021. Clean Craftsmanship: Disciplines, Standards, and Ethics. Addison-Wesley Professional.

References 

Living people
American software engineers
1952 births
Agile software development
Software design patterns